Tillandsia cucaensis is a species in the genus Tillandsia. This species is native to Costa Rica, El Salvador, Guatemala, Honduras, Mexico and Nicaragua. It was first described in 1891.

References 

cucaensis
Flora of Central America
Flora of Mexico
Epiphytes